Andrew Sainsbury (born 11 May 1974) is an Australian former cricketer. He played four first-class matches for New South Wales in 1998/99.

See also
 List of New South Wales representative cricketers

References

External links
 

1974 births
Living people
Australian cricketers
New South Wales cricketers
People from Gosford
Cricketers from New South Wales